In the 2010s, uprisings of the  Islamic State (IS), formerly called the Islamic State of Iraq and the Levant (ISIL) or the Islamic State of Iraq and Syria (ISIS), have led to violations of religious freedom in certain parts of Iraq. IS is a Sunni jihadist group that claims religious authority over all Muslims around the world and aspires to bring most of the Muslim-inhabited regions of the world under its political control beginning with Iraq. ISIS follows an extreme anti-Western interpretation of Islam, promotes religious violence and regards those who do not agree with its interpretations as infidels or apostates. Concurrently, IS aims to establish a Salafist-orientated Islamist state in Iraq, Syria and other parts of the Levant.

As ISIL lost territory throughout Iraq in 2016, the armed forces and allied militias restored crosses, and Christians were allowed to return to their homes.

Status of religious freedom
In 2006 The Globe correspondent Khidir Domle stated that the Kurdistan Regional Government (KRG) engaged in discriminatory behaviour against Christians, and that according to Assyrian Christians, the Kurdistan Democratic Party (KDP)-dominated judiciary did so routinely against Assyrians, failing to enforce judgments in their favour. The KRG rejected these accusations.

See also
Religion in Iraq
Human rights in Iraq

References

General references
 United States Bureau of Democracy, Human Rights and Labour. Iraq: International Religious Freedom Report 2007. This article incorporates text from this source, which is in the public domain.

Inline citations

Iraq
Human rights in Iraq
Religion in Iraq